Amanat is a surname. Notable people with the surname include:

Abbas Amanat (born 1947), Iranian-American historian
Agha Hasan Amanat (1815–1858), Urdu poet, writer and playwright
Hossein Amanat (born 1942), Iranian-Canadian architect
Omar Amanat, American businessman
Shafqat Amanat Ali (born 1965), Pakistani classical singer
Sana Amanat, American comic book creator and editor